The Peony Pavilion is a 1998 production by Peter Sellars, in a mix of Chinese and English translation, of the Ming Dynasty play The Peony Pavilion.

Part One is an avant-garde staging of the traditional Kunqu form of Chinese opera's staging of the play, which is how the play is usually performed in China. Part Two is a specially-composed two-hour opera by Tan Dun, mixing Chinese and western forms and instruments.

Recordings
Sony Classics released a 1998 CD, Bitter Love: A Song Cycle sung in English by Ying Huang and the New York Virtuoso Singers based on portions of the score for Part Two.

References

1998 operas
Operas
Operas set in China
Operas by Tan Dun
Plays set in the Song dynasty